The Botswana Hotel Travel & Tourism Workers' Union (BHT&TWU) is a trade union affiliate of the Botswana Federation of Trade Unions in Botswana.

References

Botswana Federation of Trade Unions
Hospitality industry trade unions
Organisations based in Selebi-Phikwe
Trade unions in Botswana